Blaine Cook (born December 19, 1980) is a Canadian software engineer, now living and working in Nelson, British Columbia.

Career 
Cook is the principal co-author of the OAuth and WebFinger specifications. He is the former lead developer of social networking site Twitter. He has also worked for Yahoo! on the Fire Eagle project and for BT Group as part of their open source Osmosoft team. He was founder of collaborative text editing startup Poetica. Poetica was acquired by Condé Nast in March 2016 and Cook remained with the company as a staff engineer.

References

External links
 Cook's Home page
 "Why Twitter Matters" by Stephen Baker, Business Week (May 15, 2008)
 "Twitter techie Blaine Cook talks about leaving" by Caroline McCarthy, CNET News (April 23, 2008)
 "Twitter to jump off Ruby on Rails?" by Anthony Ha, The Industry Standard (May 1, 2008)
 "Busy Twitter a poster child for new communications" by Stephen Lawson, Computerworld (March 14, 2008))
 "Twitter’s to-do list: Become obsessive about uptime" by Larry Dignan, ZDNet (April 23, 2008)
 "Ireland not open for business, says Twitter innovator" by Kathryn Johnston The Times (February 8, 2009)

Living people
Canadian software engineers
1980 births
Web developers
Canadian computer programmers
Twitter, Inc. people
Yahoo! employees
British Telecom people